"The Lovers" is a song written by Jimmy Jam and Terry Lewis and recorded by American recording artist Alexander O'Neal. It is the fourth single from the singer's second solo album, Hearsay (1987). The song's distinctive backing vocals were performed by Cherrelle and Lisa Keith. Following the successful chart performances of the Hearsay singles "Fake", "Criticize", and "Never Knew Love Like This", "The Lovers" was released as the album's fourth single.

Release
Alexander O'Neal's 10th hit single and it reached #28 in the UK Singles Chart. In the United States, the single reached #41 on Billboard's Hot R&B/Hip-Hop Singles & Tracks.

Track listing
 12" Maxi (Tabu 4Z9 07812)
"The Lovers (Extended Version)" – 7:02
"The Lovers (A Cappella)" – 5:16
"The Lovers (Radio Edit)" – 5:16
"The Lovers (Instrumental)" – 7:02

 7" Single (Tabu ZS4 07795)
"The Lovers" – 3:50
"The Lovers (Instrumental)" – 3:50

 CD Single (Tabu 651595 2)
"The Lovers (Extended Version)" – 7:02
"The Lovers (Bonus Beats)" – 5:00
"The Lovers (Instrumental)" – 7:02

Personnel
Credits are adapted from the album's liner notes.
 Alexander O'Neal – lead vocals 
 Jimmy Jam – drum and keyboard programming, keyboards, percussion, handclaps
 Terry Lewis – percussion, backing vocals
 Steve Hodge – percussion
 Cherrelle, Randy Ran, Lisa Keith – backing vocals
 Jellybean Johnson, James 'Popeye' Greer, Kelli Anderson – handclaps

Sales chart performance

Peak positions

References

External links
 

1988 singles
Alexander O'Neal songs
1986 songs
Tabu Records singles
Songs written by Jimmy Jam and Terry Lewis
Song recordings produced by Jimmy Jam and Terry Lewis